= Jamaliya Muslim Maha Vidyalaya =

Jamaliya Muslim Maha Vidyalaya is a school in Batagolladeniya in the district of Kandy in Sri Lanka.

== Description ==
The school was founded in 1978 as a primary school with a small number of children. The first principal of this school was A. H. M. Naeem. The late Pradesha Saba member M. H. M. Nazeer worked very hard to develop this school. Alhaj J L M Junaideen brothers donated the land for the school. Mr. M M Satheek from Muthur became the Principal. N. A. Azeez was the principal of the school from 20 September 1989 to 1996. During his tenure, the school achieved the best academic results in the region and acquired many buildings, a playground (the land for playground was bought by Alhaj Muslim Salahudeen), a science laboratory, and other facilities.

From 1996 Mr. A H M Hussain took over as the Principal of the school up to 2001. During his tenure an activity room was built and then Mr. A.H.M.Kaleelur Rahuman became the Principal of the school.

Later Mr. S. H. M. Riyaldeen became the principal this school. He was the first English teacher of the school. During his period as the Principal a multimedia unit was formed, computer unit was developed, and sanitary facilities were made with the help of SEMP-11 project and some well wishers and a two-storey building was constructed. During his period in 2006 this school was awarded the best school among the Tamil medium schools in the zone. During his tenure the school got the best academic results in the region and got another one acre of land for the playground from Alhaj Kamil Kuthubdeen), and other facilities.

Later Mr. M.Z.A CAREEM (B.COM) became the principal this school.he did many services to School.During his tenure the school got the best academic results in the region and got many buildings other facilities.

It became a Maha Vidyalaya with government funding and started Arts and commerce A Level classes. The school currently serves about 450 students of the region.
